Valtos is a village in the municipality of Orestiada in the northern part of the Evros regional unit in Greece. In 2011 its population was 403. It is 17 km west of the centre of Orestiada. The nearest larger village is Fylakio to its northwest. Valtos was annexed to Greece in 1920.

Population

See also
List of settlements in the Evros regional unit

References

Orestiada
Populated places in Evros (regional unit)